Pseudopycnadena is a genus of trematodes in the family Opecoelidae.

Species
Pseudopycnadena fischthali Saad-Fares & Maillard, 1986
Pseudopycnadena tendu Bray & Justine, 2007

References

Opecoelidae
Plagiorchiida genera